Anna Lindmarker, (born 5 January 1961) is a Swedish journalist and news presenter at TV4s Nyheterna. She is the daughter of foreign correspondence Ingmar Lindmarker, and during her upbringing she lived with her family in cities like Moscow, New York and Washington DC. During her high school years she started to freelance as a journalist, and then started studying journalism at Poppius journalistskola. After working at several local radio stations, she started to work at Sveriges Radio at the news show Ekot.

During 1989, she started to work as a news presenter for Aktuellt which was broadcast on SVT. In 1997 she started working for TV4 as a news presenter instead for their news broadcast Nyheterna.

References

External links 
 
 

Living people
1961 births
20th-century Swedish journalists
Swedish women journalists
Journalists from Stockholm
Swedish television personalities
Swedish women television presenters